Sigmund Zeisler (1860-1931) was a German-Jewish U.S. attorney born in Austria and known for his defense of radicals in Chicago in the 1880s.  His wife was the famed concert pianist Fannie Bloomfield Zeisler.

Childhood, marriage and legal education
Sigmund Zeisler was born in Bielitz, Austrian Silesia in 1860. He began his education at the University of Vienna and  emigrated to Chicago in 1883.

Zeisler graduated from Northwestern University Law School in 1884.

Personal life
In 1885 he married his second cousin Fannie Bloomfield, sister of philologist Maurice Bloomfield and the aunt of linguist Leonard Bloomfield. The Zeislers had three sons: Leonard Bloomfield Zeisler, Paul Bloomfield Zeisler, and Ernest Bloomfield Zeisler (married to Claire Zeisler). After Fannie Bloomfield-Zeisler's death in 1927, Zeisler married Amelia Spellman in 1930. He died in 1931.

Professional career
In 1886-1887, Zeisler was co-counsel for the defendants in the Anarchist cases, popularly known as the Haymarket cases.  Zeisler was a progressive and was a member of the American Anti-Imperialist League, the Municipal Voters' League, and the Civil Service Reform Association.

Zeisler was a writer and lectured on legal topics. Zeisler was a member of the Chicago Literary Club, The Little Room, Book and Play and the Cliff Dwellers Club.

Cases
The Haymarket trials
HEATH & MILLIGAN MFG CO. v. WORST 207 U.S. 338 (1907) regarding lead-based paint.

Publications
 Zeisler, Sigmund  "The Legal and Moral Aspects of Abortion," remarks at the 1910 meeting of the Chicago Gynecological Society, printed in the Journal of Surgery, Gynecology and Obstetrics, Vol. 10, p. 539.
Zeisler, Sigmund Reminiscences Of The Anarchist Case Chicago Literary Club 1927 1st Wraps, very good, 40pp, 1/570. PB

Notes

External links
 
Fannie Bloomfield-Zeisler and Sigmund Zeisler Papers Newberry Library Chicago
Jewish Encyclopedia article
Illinois vs. August Spies et al. trial transcript no. 1 Affidavit of Sigmund Zeisler (Cctober 1, 1886)
Zeisler, Ernest Bloomfeld The Haymarket Affair The Nation book review  (1956)
Photo of Zeisler Chicago Historical Assn.

1860 births
1931 deaths
People from Austrian Silesia
People from Bielsko
Lawyers from Chicago
Austrian Jews
Jews and Judaism in Chicago
American people of Austrian-Jewish descent